Mohammed Said Ramadan Al-Bouti (1929 – 21 March 2013) was a notable Sunni Muslim scholar who was also known as "Shaykh of the Levant". He was killed during the Syrian civil war, reportedly in a bomb explosion, though "many questions about the death" have been raised by videos of the scene.

Called a "prolific writer whose sermons were regularly broadcast on television",<ref>*Quote from Zeina Karam in Huffington Post"He has authored more than 60 books and was a prominent religious reference in the Muslim world, holding the presidency of the Scholars Union for the Levant region."</ref> and "more familiar to Syrian TV viewers than anybody other than President Bashar al-Assad", Al-Bouti wrote more than sixty books on various Islamic issues, and was considered an important scholar of the approach based on the four schools of Sunni Islam and the orthodox Ash'arite creed. He also wrote on non-religious subjects. For instance, he translated Mam and Zin, the famous Kurdish story, to Arabic.

 Early life 

Al-Bouti was born in 1929 in the village of Jilka, near Cizre in Turkey. He came from a Kurdish tribe that was present in a number of regions across Syria, Iraq and Turkey.

The family immigrated to Damascus when al-Bouti was four years old. Al-Bouti was soon enrolled in a school providing religious education in Damascus. At the age of eleven, al-Bouti studied the Qur'an and Prophet Muhammad's biography with Shaykh Hasan Habannakah and Shaykh al-Maradlnl in the Jami' Manjak Mosque in al-Midan. Later when the mosque was transformed into the Institute of Islamic Orientation (ma'had al-tauyTh al-islami), he studied Qur'an exegesis (tafsir), logic, rhetoric and the fundamental principles of Islamic law (usul al-fiqh) until 1953.
 
In 1954 he travelled to Cairo to complete his undergraduate studies at Al Azhar University, at the Faculty of Sharia.

On the completion of his three-year degree in law from the Faculty of Sharia Al-Azhar, and another Diploma in Education from the Faculty of English again at Al-Azhar, al-Bouti returned to Damascus with a Sharfa teaching qualification (ijaza) and an education diploma.

Career
Al-Bouti started his career teaching at a secondary school in Homs between 1958 and 1961. He was appointed lecturer at the Faculty of Sharia at the University of Damascus in 1960. He went to Al Azhar University for a doctorate in Shariah and received his doctorate (PhD) in 1965.

He returned as an instructor at the University of Damascus in 1965, eventually becoming the dean of the Faculty of Sharia at the same university from 1977 to 1983. He subsequently became a lecturer in comparative law and religious studies at Damascus University; for some time he was also the Dean of the Sharfa faculty. Al-Bouti was professor of comparative law, and worked as lecturer on Islamic Creed (aqeedah) and Muhammad's Biography (seerah).

He was also a visiting professor at many Arab and Islamic universities and supervised the master's and doctoral degrees in the Sharia College at Damascus University and other universities.

Al-Bouti was a member of the Aal al-Bayt Foundation for Islamic Thought in Amman, Jordan, of the Supreme Council of the Academy of Oxford and of the Supreme Advisory Council for the Tabah Foundation in Abu Dhabi.

During the Muslim Brotherhood's revolution in 1979 in Syria, al-Bouti vocally condemned the attacks of Islamic militants, while most of his senior colleagues were either silent or supportive of the opposition.  Al-Bouti was chosen for the Dubai International Holy Quran Award in its eighth session in 2004 (1425 AH) to be the "personality of the Muslim world". In 2008, Al-Bouti was appointed preacher of the Umayyad Mosque in Damascus.

Thought
Most of al-Bouti's ideas are put forward within the framework of traditional legal scholarship, frequently referring to Qur'anic verses, Hadith and the opinions of the leading classical authorities, in particular al-Nawawi, Ibn al-Arabi, al-Ghazali, and al-Shafi'i. Due to his profession, al-Bouti regards Islamic law as the core of the Islamic religion; whenever he speaks of Islam he means the principles, injunctions and practical implications of the Sharia.

In his preaching and writings, Al Bouti worked to refute not only secularism but other western ideologies such as Marxism and nationalism. In addition he criticized the proponents of what some viewed as Islamic reform, from modernist Muhammad Abduh to Salafi literalist Muhammad Nasiruddin al-Albani.

He devoted one book to criticising dialectical materialism. He wrote two books refuting the views of Salafism and explaining their incoherence:Al-La Madhhabiyya (Abandoning the Madhhabs) is the most dangerous Bid‘ah Threatening the Islamic Shari'aAs-Salaf was a blessed epoch, not a school of thought.

Al-Bouti had a "long-standing opposition to both military and political activism in the name of Islam" based on the belief that Islam should be 'the common element that unites' all political forces rather than taking the side of one force, which he explained in his book Jihad in Islam'' (1993). Al-Bouti was not, however, opposed to operations carried out by the Palestinians in the occupied territories against the state of Israel. He supported the decision of Azhar University to freeze the dialogue with the Vatican after the Pope's comments that offended Muslims.

Al-Bouti specialized in fiqh (Islamic jurisprudence) and usul al-fiqh (principles of jurisprudence) according to the Shafi'i school of law. Most of his views are based on the Qur'an, hadiths and the opinions of the leading classical authorities, such as al-Nawawi, al-Ghazali and al-Shafi’i.

Syrian protests 2011 and his position
Following the outbreak of the Syrian revolution in March 2011, Al-Bouti criticised anti-government protests and urged demonstrators not to follow "calls of unknown sources that want to exploit mosques to incite seditions and chaos in Syria."

The opposition called him a hypocrite over his support for the uprising in Egypt, which he had written was Islamic, only to condemn protests as un-Islamic when they broke out in Syria itself. Al-Bouti did criticise President Assad in public, shortly after demonstrations had started, for a government decision to fire hundreds of female teachers for wearing the hijab. Following Al-Bouti's criticism, the decision was quickly revoked by President Assad.

Assassination

Al-Bouti was killed while giving a religious lesson to students at the Al-Iman Mosque in the central Mazraa district of Damascus. The bomb attack reportedly killed at least 42 people and wounded more than 84. It marked the first time during the civil war a suicide bomber detonated explosives inside a mosque. Al-Bouti's death is said to have removed "one of the few remaining pillars of opposition to the uprising" among the majority Sunni Muslims who have formed the base of support for the uprising.

According to Thomas Pierret – a lecturer in Contemporary Islam at the University of Edinburgh – the death of Al-Bouti means the loss of the "last credible ally among the Sunni religious elite" for the Syrian government.  Al-Bouti was "a Muslim scholar of world standing," Pierret states.

There was no immediate claim of responsibility for the attack and both the government and the opposition condemned the attack and accused each other of perpetrating it. Among opposition forces there was "a mixture of suspicion and shock that a notable religious figure ... would be targeted" by a suicide bomber inside a mosque.

Videos
Some, including Jim Muir of the BBC, have questioned whether a bomb killed Al-Bouti. Official film footage shown on Syrian television taken after the bombing appears to belie a bomb scene, showing "superficial debris, but not the kind of structural damage or bloodbath that would be expected from a huge bomb killing 50 people in an enclosed space".

The BBC claims Al-Bouti shows no sign of serious injury following the explosion, and his desk and the books on it are not disturbed. However within seconds a man with his back to the camera walks up to the scholar, does something and then leaves, leaving al-Bouti "limp" and "bleeding heavily from the mouth and from a wound to the left side of his head". Almost immediately al-Bouti is carried away by five other figures. None of the figures show any attempt "to attend to [Al-Bouti] or investigate his injuries", and their movements have "nothing of the panic and chaos that accompanies big bomb explosions in crowded places".  The authenticity of this video "has not so far been seriously challenged" and its "implication seemed to be that the sheikhs' killing was the work of the regime".

In reply to the video, Syrianews.cc gave an interview to the Sheikh's son, Tawfiq for his account of the event. According to the interview,     "All the injured told the same story of the bombing, a man entered the mosque & sat alone. Later he walked and bombed himself. My father leaned to the right after being injured and tried to adjust his hat. When the injury took effect he fell to the left."

In December 2013, Syrian television showed what it claimed were confessions to the murder of al-Bouti by Syrian, Iraqi and Palestinian members of Jabhat al-Nusra.

Works 
Al-Bouti published nearly 60 books and religious publications (in Arabic), some of philosophical nature. Most of his philosophical works are published by Dar Al-Fikr:

Selective books include:
 نقض أوهام المادية الجدلية (Illusions of Dialectical Materialism) 
 المذاهب التوحيدية والفلسفات المعاصرة (Monotheistic Schools and Contemporary Philosophies)
 كبرى اليقينيات الكونية :وجود الخالق و وظيفة المخلوق (The Greatest Universal Sureties: The Creator's Existence and the Creature's Function)
 أوربة من التقنية إلى الروحانية – مشكلة الجسر المقطوع (Europe from Technology to Spiritual Life – The problem of a broken bridge)
 حوار حول مشكلات حضارية (Dialogue About Civilizational Issues)
 فقه السيرة النبوية مع موجز لتاريخ الخلافة الراشدة (Jurisprudence Biography of the Prophet With a Brief History of the First Caliphate RadiAllahu Anhum Ajma'een
(لحوار سبيل التعايش (ندوات الفكر المعاصر (Dialogue Among Civilizations : The Way for Coexistence (seminars about contemporary thought))
 المذهب الاقتصادي بين الشيوعية والإسلام (Economic Theory Between Communism and Islam)
 قضايا فقهية معاصرة. (Contemporary Jurisprudential Issues) (two volumes)
 المذاهب التوحيدية والفلسفات المعاصرة (Monotheistic Religions and Modern Philosophies)
 باكورة اعمالي الفكرية (The Early fruits of My Intellectual Works)
 منهج الحضارة الإنسانية في القرآن (Methodology of Human Civilization in the Koran)
 (الإسلام والعصر تحديات وآفاق (حوارات لقرن جديد (Islam and Modern Age: Challenges and Prospects (Dialogues for a New Century))
 (التغيير مفهومه وطرائقه (ندوات الفكر المعاصر (The Change, its Concept and Modalities (Modern Thought Seminars))
 دور الأديان في السلام العالمي (The Role of Religions in World Peace)
 حقائق عن نشأة القومية (Facts about the Emergence of Nationalism)
 المرأة بين طغيان النظام الغربي ولطائف التشريع الرباني (Women: The Tyranny of the Western System and the Kindness in Divine Legislation)
 هذا والدي (This Is My Father) (a biography of Mulla Ramadan Al-Bouti) 
 مموزين (Momo Zein) (a Kurdish novel by Ahmede Khani) 
 الجهاد في الإسلام: كيف نفهمه؟ وكيف نمارسه؟ (The Jihad in Islam: How Should We Understand? And How Should We Practice?)
 الإنسان مسير أم مخير (Human beings between compatibilism and determinism)
 هذه مشكلاتهم (These Are Their Problems)
 عائشة: ام المؤمنين (Aisha: Mother of Believers) 
 في سبيل الله والحق (In the Sake of God and Rightness)
 الحِكم العطائية شرح وتحليل (Al-Attaúah Advices, Explanation, and Analysis) (4 volumes)
 مشورات اجتماعية (Social advices)
 هذا ما قلته أمام بعض الرؤساء والملوك (That's What I Said to Some presidents and Kings)
  التعرف على الذات هو الطريق المعبد إلى الإسلام (The recognition of self is a Paved Way to Islam)
 من روائع القرآن الكريم (Some Masterpieces of the Holy Koran)
 شخصيات استوقفتني (Personalities That attracted my observation)
 
TV programs:
لا يأتيه الباطل – Shaam channel / Sani'ou al Qarar channel
Koranic studies, Syrian Satellite TV
شرح كتاب كبرى اليقينيات الكونية – in the series "Al Kalaam al Tayyeb" – Al-Resalah Satellite TV
مشاهد وعبر –  Al-Resalah Satellite TV
فقه السيرة – Iqraa TV
شرح الحكم العطائية – Sufiah channel.
الجديد في إعجاز القرآن الكريم – Iqraa TV
هذا هو الجهاد – Azhari TV channel.

References

External links

Collected English Translations from the Works of Shaykh Buti
Useful quotes from Shaykh Said Ramadan al-Buti
Sheikh Buti's refutation of al-Albani
al-La Madhhabiyya

1929 births
2013 deaths
Al-Azhar University alumni
Asharis
Shafi'is
Islam and politics
Islamism
Islamic philosophers
Kurdish Sunni Muslims
Muslim reformers
20th-century Muslim scholars of Islam
Syrian Sufi religious leaders
Syrian Sunni clerics
Syrian Kurdish people
Filmed assassinations
Mass murder in 2013
Kurdish–Arabic translators
Turkish emigrants to Syria
Syrian expatriates in Egypt